Sibthorpia is a genus of flowering plants in the family Plantaginaceae, with a peculiar distribution in the mountains of North America, South America and Africa, and the coasts of Europe.

Species
Currently accepted species include:
Sibthorpia africana L.
Sibthorpia conspicua Diels
Sibthorpia europaea L.
Sibthorpia peregrina L.
Sibthorpia repens (Mutis ex L.) Kuntze

References

Plantaginaceae
Plantaginaceae genera